Herbert Heywood (1913 - unknown) was an English footballer. His regular position was as a forward. He was born in Bolton. He played for Tranmere Rovers and Manchester United.

External links
MUFCInfo.com profile

1913 births
English footballers
Tranmere Rovers F.C. players
Manchester United F.C. players
Year of death missing
Footballers from Bolton
Association football forwards